Trichonomada is a genus of cuckoo bees in the family Apidae. The only species in the genus species is Trichonomada roigella; which has subsequently been included in the genus Brachynomada.

References

Further reading

External links

Nomadinae
Monotypic Hymenoptera genera